Shorten may refer to:

 Shorten (file format), for compressing audio data
 Shorten (surname), an English surname

See also
 Short (disambiguation)
 Shorton (disambiguation)